Meta SaaS was a software company headquartered in Austin, Texas that provided Software Asset Management (SAM) for SaaS products.

History 
In September 2016, Arlo Gilbert alongside co-founder Scott Hertel launched Meta SaaS in Austin to solve problems related to the growth of unmanaged SaaS at businesses.

In 2016, Meta SaaS raised $2.1 million in seed funding. Investors in this seed round announced in May 2017 included Mark Cuban, Barracuda_Networks, Capital Factory, and others

Among its first clients were Spredfast, RetailMeNot, and Indeed.com.

In May 2018,  Meta SaaS was acquired by Flexera Software, a private software company based in Itasca, Illinois.

Software and services 
Meta SaaS publishes software that provides SaaS management and aggregated utilization reporting providing a 360-degree view across all cloud applications, systems of record, and various financial tools. Meta SaaS displays the unified customer information in near-real-time to administrators at customer sites. Meta SaaS is used by businesses in various industries such as technology, healthcare, software, education, and others.

It offers features in the following areas: SaaS management, SaaS license optimization, and Shadow IT identification.

Meta SaaS integrates vendors including Salesforce, Box, Workday, Cisco, Zendesk, and others.

References 



Business intelligence companies
Companies based in Austin, Texas
Defunct software companies of the United States